Aaryan Dinesh Kanagaratnam (born 31 August 1981), also known by his initials A. D. K. or simply Dinesh Kanagaratnam, is a Sri Lankan R&B and hip hop artist and music producer who has composed tracks in Tamil language. He also often collaborates with music directors in Tamil cinema as a playback singer.

Early life and career

Dinesh was born in Badulla and raised in Modara, Sri Lanka. He studied information technology (IT) in Trichy, Tamil Nadu, India and started teaching IT courses in Sri Lanka. He began working with local musicians part-time to pursue his growing interest in music. In 2004, he was given a chance by Bathiya, an artist in Sri Lanka and started recording rap songs until he was discovered by Vijay Antony. He collaborated with him for the song "Aathichudi" for the soundtrack of the film TN 07 AL 4777 (2008) in 2009 which is a remake of Surangani, a song from his first independent album, Tamizha Back in Sri Lanka, he did a cross-culture album in 2005 which includes songs in Tamil, Sinhala and English.

His next throughout in cinema industry was "Magudi", which was his first collaboration with A. R. Rahman for the Mani Ratnam-directed film Kadal (2013). He was featured along with Anirudh Ravichander for the song "Mun Sellada" in the film Manithan (2016), composed by Santhosh Narayanan. 
Kanagaratnam and rapper Sri Rascol formed a record label called Rap Machines and have done other rap musics.

He continued to work in Tamil and Telugu cinema, writing and performing English language rap for soundtracks, including the title track "Maayon" in Mersal (2017) composed by A. R. Rahman, the song "Gala Gala" featured with Megha from Race Gurram composed by S. Thaman and also a background score (which had been deleted later) in Nerkonda Paarvai. He also worked in 2.0 (2018).
Kanagaratnam has joined concert tours in Sri Lanka, the Middle East, India, Malaysia and Singapore. He is well known for his rap battles at every A. R. Rahman concert tours alongside Lady Kash and Blaaze. In January 2019, Kanagaratnam performed with Bathiya and Santhush at Oba Nisa in Sri Lanka.

Discography

Independent tracks & album 

 2005 - Cross Culture
2009 - Nagara Vaytai, Kuruvi
2011 - Dhoomi Dhaala
2012 - Aaryan - Goka Pearu, Kuruvi, Hollaback Muniamma, You Ate My Money
2015 - Uyir Poo
2016 – present; RAP MACHINES - AYM Tribute, Vellai Poove, Maayavi, Pudhiya Era, Hollaback Muaniamma 2 and others.
2017 - Yeanadi Penne - IRAJ Ft. Krish Manoj & ADK - Melody By Chamath Sangeeth , ADK 155 Documentary Film, 
2018 - Kannaley Kollathey
2019 - RAP MACHINES: Poraali Elvi ft ADK, 2.0 X Petta Mashup by Allan Preetham ft ADK

Playback singing

Television

References

Living people
Sri Lankan Tamil musicians
Sri Lankan rappers
21st-century Sri Lankan male singers
1981 births
Bigg Boss (Tamil TV series) contestants